The paired (right and left) medial anterior thalamic veins originate each from the medial anterior part of the thalamus. Benno Shlesinger in 1976 classified these veins as belonging to the central group of thalamic veins.

References 

Thalamic veins